The Six Days' Campaign saw four victories by the Imperial French army led by Napoleon over the Army of Silesia commanded by Prussian Field Marshal Gebhard Leberecht von Blücher. Between 10 and 15 February 1814, the French inflicted losses of at least 14,034 men and 52 guns on the Army of Silesia. A second estimate listed 16,000 casualties and 60 guns. A third estimate reached as high as 20,000 casualties, but a calculation by historian George Nafziger suggested that Blücher may have lost 28,500 soldiers.

After their victory over Napoleon in the Battle of La Rothière on 1 February 1814, the two main Allied armies separated. Austrian Field Marshal Karl Philipp, Prince of Schwarzenberg's Army of Bohemia marched west toward Troyes while Blücher's Army of Silesia moved north to Châlons-sur Marne and turned west along the Marne River, aiming for Meaux. Leaving 39,000 troops to watch the cautious Schwarzenberg, Napoleon assembled a strike force of 20,000 infantry and 10,000 cavalry to deal with the more aggressive Blücher. Fabian Gottlieb von Osten-Sacken's 20,000 Russians led the column, followed by Ludwig Yorck von Wartenburg's 18,000 Prussians, Zakhar Dmitrievich Olsufiev's 4,000 Russians, Peter Mikhailovich Kaptzevich's Russians and Friedrich Graf Kleist von Nollendorf's Prussians, the last two forces totaling 15,000 men.

Organization

Russian
The Russian forces were organized into army corps with infantry corps and cavalry corps subordinated to it. The full structure can be seen in the Sacken's Russian order of battle section. The Russian IX Infantry Corps, as shown in the Olsufiev's Russian order of battle section, and the Russian X Corps, as shown in the Kaptzevich's Russian order of battle section, both reported to their superior, General-Leutnant Louis Alexandre Andrault de Langeron. Since Langeron did not appear in the theater of operations until late February, they temporarily reported directly to Blücher.

In the Russian army, artillery batteries were organized with 12 pieces each. In 1805, Aleksey Arakcheyev introduced a new range of field artillery that consisted of 6- and 12-pounder cannons and 10- and 20-pounder licornes, a gun similar to a howitzer. An Allied order of battle from 1 January 1814 noted that Light Batteries were armed with 6-pounders. The same list stated that of five Position Batteries in one army corps, three had 12 guns, one had 11 guns, and one had seven guns. In the Russian 3rd Dragoon Division, Horse Battery Nr. 18 was armed with only 10 guns, but usually the specific number of guns in a battery was not stated.

Prussian
When the Prussian army was rebuilt after the disastrous War of the Fourth Coalition, its reduced establishment did not allow for the formation of divisions. Therefore, the next tactical unit below corps level became the brigade, which included both cavalry and artillery. Batteries were formed from six 6- or 12-pounder cannons and two 7- or 10-pounder howitzers. Artillery batteries that were not assigned to the brigades were posted to the corps reserve. By 1813, each corps incorporated four brigades and included a mix of regular and Landwehr units.

French
A French order of battle from 6 January 1814 showed 10 Young Guard Foot Artillery and one Old Guard Foot Artillery companies each armed with six 6-pounder guns and two howitzers. There were four Old Guard Foot Artillery companies armed with six 12-pounder guns and two howitzers. Six Old Guard Horse Artillery companies were each armed with four 6-pounder guns and two howitzers. Eight guns per foot artillery company and six guns per horse artillery company represented the standard French organization. However, at the Battle of La Rothière on 1 February, the Allies captured 50–60 French guns. Which artillery companies lost guns was not stated.

Battle of Champaubert
Napoleon with 30,000 men and 120 guns surprised Olsufiev south of Champaubert on the morning of 10 February. Unwisely, Olsufiev decided to fight it out, hoping for help from Blücher. By 3:00 pm the Russians were forced back through Champaubert. Too late, Olsufiev tried to retreat east to Étoges, but found both flanks enveloped by French cavalry. Olsufiev lost as many as 4,000 men out of 5,000 troops, or as few as 2,400 and nine guns out of a total of 3,700 men and 24 guns. Olsufiev and Prince Konstantin Poltoratsky ended the day as French prisoners. French losses were about 600.

Olsufiev's Russian order of battle

French Army order of battle
Commander-in-chief: Emperor NapoleonChief of Staff: Marshal Louis-Alexandre Berthier

The units available to fight at Champaubert were the 1st Old Guard Division, the Guard artillery, the 1st and 3rd Guard Cavalry Divisions, the 1st and 2nd Young Guard Divisions, both divisions of the VI Corps, both divisions of the I Cavalry Corps, and Cyrille-Simon Picquet's cavalry brigade.

After General of Division Pierre Decouz was killed at the Battle of Brienne, General of Brigade Jean-Jacques Germain Pelet-Clozeau temporarily commanded the 2nd Young Guard Division through the battles of 10–11 February. Then he was reassigned to lead a brigade in the 1st Old Guard Division.

Battle of Montmirail
On 11 February, Napoleon marched west through Montmirail with 10,500 men, consisting of the Old Guard, Étienne Pierre Sylvestre Ricard's division, and 36 guns. The French faced Fabian Wilhelm von Osten-Sacken's 18,000 Russians (with 80 or 90 guns) and Ludwig Yorck von Wartenburg's 18,000 Prussians. Sacken tried to force his way to the west, but Yorck's troops were delayed. By 4:00 pm, Napoleon's strength rose to 20,000. The French defeated Sacken's corps while Marshal Édouard Mortier repelled Yorck's belated attack. Sacken lost 2,000 killed and wounded plus 800 men, 13 guns, and six colors captured. The Prussians sustained 900 casualties while the French lost 2,000. French Generals Claude-Étienne Michel and François-Louis Boudin de Roville and Prussian General Otto Karl Lorenz von Pirch were wounded.

Sacken's Russian order of battle
General-Leutnant Fabian Wilhelm von Osten-Sacken

Yorck's Prussian order of battle
The 1st Brigade under General-major Otto Karl Lorenz von Pirch and the 7th Brigade under General-major Heinrich Wilhelm von Horn were engaged. The only Prussian artillery present were the two batteries attached to the 1st and 7th Brigades. The remainder of the artillery was unable to get forward because of poor condition of the roads. The 8th Brigade was sent back to hold Château-Thierry in case of an attack by Marshal Jacques MacDonald.

French order of battle
At Montmirail, Napoleon had the 1st and 2nd Old Guard Divisions, the 1st and 2nd Young Guard Divisions, the 1st, 2nd, and 3rd Guard Cavalry Divisions, Defrance's Cavalry Division, and Ricard's division. Marshal Marmont took position at Étoges with Lagrange's division and the I Cavalry Corps with orders to observe Blücher. Charles Lefebvre-Desnouettes led either the 2nd Guard Cavalry Division or the 3rd Young Guard Division; it is unclear.

Battle of Château-Thierry
After being beaten by Napoleon's army at Montmirail, the corps of Sacken and Yorck withdrew toward Château-Thierry. When the Allied rearguard tried to hold off the French pursuit, Marshal Ney scattered the cavalry protecting the Allied left flank. The Prussian infantry escaped across the Marne River, but the French trapped a Russian brigade on the right flank and forced it to surrender. For the loss of 600 killed and wounded, the French inflicted 1,250 casualties on the Prussians and 1,500 casualties on the Russians. The French captured nine guns and many wagons. The Allies retreated to Fismes while the French repaired the broken bridge. The next day, Marshal Mortier led the pursuit with the divisions of Christiani, Colbert, and Defrance. The French captured 300–400 stragglers while as many as 2,000 more were turned in by groups of French farmers, who were infuriated by Allied plundering during the previous week.

French order of battle
On the morning of the battle, Saint-Germain reinforced Napoleon with 2,400 horsemen belonging to the II Cavalry Corps. Marshal MacDonald had destroyed the Trilport bridge over the Marne, which was on the direct route from Meaux to Montmirail. Therefore, the marshal sent Saint-Germain on a detour through Coulommiers to reach the main army. As on the previous day, Marmont's 4,000 soldiers continued to watch Blücher.

Battle of Vauchamps
Napoleon found that Blücher drove Marmont's force from Étoges and decided to move against the Prussian field marshal. The French emperor left Château-Thierry at 3:00 am on 14 February for a rendezvous with Marmont.  That morning, Blücher advanced west to Vauchamps where he ran into stiff resistance. Blücher decided to retreat after seeing the French cavalry defeat the Allied cavalry and discovering that he was facing Napoleon in person. The 25,000 French enjoyed a numerical advantage over the 20,000 Allied soldiers. By the end of the day, the French inflicted 7,000 casualties on their enemies and captured 16 guns; French losses were only 600. The losses include the remnant of Olsufiev's corps which lost 600 men and all its remaining artillery.

Kaptzevich's Russian order of battle

Kleist's Prussian order of battle

French order of battle
Hearing about Blücher's advance to Champaubert, Napoleon ordered Ricard's division to rejoin the VI Corps. He reorganized Marshal MacDonald's infantry into the XI Corps and sent it south to face Schwarzenberg's Allied army. Napoleon directed the following troops eastward to face Blücher: Friant's 1st Old Guard Division, Ney's two Young Guard divisions, Nansouty's 2nd and 3rd Guard Cavalry Divisions, and Saint-Germain's II Cavalry Corps. Jean Francois Leval's infantry division was marching north from Sézanne. The fighting ended before Leval's soldiers arrived on the field.

Notes
Footnotes

Citations

References

Napoleonic Wars orders of battle